Elections to Omagh District Council were held on 20 May 1981 on the same day as the other Northern Irish local government elections. The election used four district electoral areas to elect a total of 20 councillors.

Election results

Note: "Votes" are the first preference votes.

Districts summary

|- class="unsortable" align="centre"
!rowspan=2 align="left"|Ward
! % 
!Cllrs
! % 
!Cllrs
! %
!Cllrs
! %
!Cllrs
! % 
!Cllrs
! % 
!Cllrs
!rowspan=2|TotalCllrs
|- class="unsortable" align="center"
!colspan=2 bgcolor="" | SDLP
!colspan=2 bgcolor="" | IIP
!colspan=2 bgcolor="" | UUP
!colspan=2 bgcolor="" | DUP
!colspan=2 bgcolor="" | Alliance
!colspan=2 bgcolor="white"| Others
|-
|align="left"|Area A
|bgcolor="#99FF66"|32.2
|bgcolor="#99FF66"|2
|23.3
|1
|24.5
|1
|14.8
|1
|1.6
|0
|3.6
|0
|5
|-
|align="left"|Area B
|8.7
|0
|13.8
|1
|bgcolor="40BFF5"|25.4
|bgcolor="40BFF5"|1
|17.0
|1
|12.6
|1
|22.5
|0
|4
|-
|align="left"|Area C
|bgcolor="#99FF66"|30.3
|bgcolor="#99FF66"|2
|17.9
|1
|17.4
|2
|19.3
|1
|14.1
|1
|1.0
|0
|7
|-
|align="left"|Area D
|23.6
|1
|bgcolor=#32CD32|37.7
|bgcolor=#32CD32|2
|10.2
|0
|13.8
|1
|5.6
|0
|9.1
|0
|4
|-
|- class="unsortable" class="sortbottom" style="background:#C9C9C9"
|align="left"| Total
|25.0
|5
|22.2
|5
|19.5
|4
|16.6
|4
|9.0
|2
|7.7
|0
|20
|-
|}

Districts results

Area A

1977: 2 x SDLP, 2 x UUP, 1 x Independent Nationalist
1981: 2 x SDLP, 1 x UUP, 1 x IIP, 1 x DUP
1977-1981 Change: IIP and DUP gain from UUP and Independent Nationalist

Area B

1977: 2 x UUP, 1 x Alliance, 1 x Independent Nationalist
1981: 1 x UUP, 1 x Alliance, 1 x DUP, 1 x IIP
1977-1981 Change: DUP gain from UUP, Independent Nationalist joins IIP

Area C

1977: 3 x SDLP, 3 x UUP, 1 x Alliance
1981: 2 x SDLP, 2 x UUP, 1 x Alliance, 1 x DUP, 1 x IIP
1977-1981 Change: DUP and IIP gain from SDLP and UUP

Data missing from stage 7 onwards

Area D

1977: 1 x SDLP, 1 x UUP, 1 x Alliance, 1 x Republican Clubs
1981: 2 x IIP, 1 x SDLP, 1 x DUP
1977-1981 Change: IIP (two seats) and DUP gain from UUP, Alliance and Republican Clubs

References

Omagh District Council elections
Omagh